Aaron James Redmond (born 23 September 1979) is a former New Zealand international cricketer. He was a member of the Otago cricket team for ten seasons. Redmond is a right-handed batsman who debuted for Canterbury in the 1999/2000 season, playing first-class and list A matches for them.

His father is Rodney Redmond, an international cricketer who scored 107 and 56 on debut for New Zealand in 1972/1973 against Pakistan at Auckland.

Domestic career
Redmond originally joined Canterbury as a leg spiner in 1999, but was became a top-order batsman after moving to Otago. He has had a solid, if not spectacular, first-class career of 68 first class matches at 31.01 with five centuries, and his part-time spin bowling has earned him over 80 wickets. In List-A cricket he averages 23.68 after over 60 matches, with two centuries. In Twenty20 cricket, he averages 14.55 and has a high score of 59 from 13 matches, having played his debut Twenty20 match on 13 January 2006 for Otago against his former team, Canterbury.

International career
After a successful domestic career, he was called up to the full international squad for their tour of England in 2008, where he made his mark with a career best 146 against the England Lions, beating his previous best of 135. He made his test debut on 15 May 2008 at Lord's, but was out for a duck off the bowling of James Anderson. Overall the three-match test series against England was a disappointment for Redmond, making a total of just 54 runs at an average of 9.00.

Redmond was dropped for the two-Test series against West Indies in December 2008. The move came after New Zealand lost a two-Test series to Australia 2–0, in which Redmond scored 115 runs at an average of 28.75. Former New Zealand cricket captain, Martin Crowe stated that he did not believe that Redmond is good enough to play Test cricket, but has conceded that his first year in Test cricket – in which he averaged 23.00 in seven matches – had been a difficult one. In December 2013 he was recalled into the Test side in the home series against the West Indies.

References

External links

 

1979 births
Living people
New Zealand cricketers
New Zealand Test cricketers
New Zealand One Day International cricketers
New Zealand Twenty20 International cricketers
Canterbury cricketers
Otago cricketers
Gloucestershire cricketers
South Island cricketers